The 1977–78 season was Blackpool F.C.'s 70th season (67th consecutive) in the Football League. They competed in the 22-team Division Two, then the second tier of English football, finishing twentieth, their lowest League position since 1928. As a result, they were relegated to Division Three for the first time in their history.

Allan Brown was sacked as manager during the season, and replaced by Jimmy Meadows for his second stint as Blackpool's caretaker manager.

Bob Hatton was the club's top scorer, with 24 goals (22 in the league, one in the FA Cup and one in the League Cup).

Table

Notes

References

Blackpool F.C.
Blackpool F.C. seasons